Scent of Rain may refer to:

Petrichor, the scent of rain on earth
Petrichor, a song by Phish from the 2016 album Big Boat
Petrichor, a track on 2017 album Life Is Fine by Paul Kelly
 Petrichor, a character in the comic series Saga by Brian K. Vaughan and Fiona Staples
Scent of Rain, 2007 play by Mark Dunn
The Scent of Rain in the Balkans, historical novel by Gordana Kuić
The Scent of Rain in the Balkans (TV series), an adaptation of the Gordana Kuić novel
The Scent of Rain and Lightning, a collection of short stories by Nancy Pickard